is an interchange passenger railway station located in the city of Wakayama, Wakayama Prefecture, Japan, jointly operated by the West Japan Railway Company (JR West) and the private railway company Wakayama Electric Railway.

Lines
It is also the western terminal of the Wakayama Electric Railway Kishigawa Line, and is located 14.3 kilometers from the opposing terminal of the line at Kishi Station.

Station layout
The station has two side platforms and three island platforms, serving a total of eight ground-level tracks. The platforms are connected by means of a footbridge and an underground passage.

Platforms

Adjacent stations

History
Wakayama Station opened on 28 February 1924.

Passenger statistics
In fiscal 2019, the JR West station was used by an average of 18,258 passengers daily (boarding passengers only) and the Wakayama Electric Railway portion by 4,346 passengers daily (boarding passengers only).

Surrounding Area
Wakayama Terminal Building
Kintetsu Department Store Wakayama Store
Wakayama MIO North Building

See also
List of railway stations in Japan

References

External links
 
  JR West Wakayama Station home page

Railway stations in Japan opened in 1924
Railway stations in Wakayama Prefecture
Wakayama (city)